The Soldier's Food is a 1942 British, black-and-white, sponsored film, of unknown direction and starring Ronald Shiner as a cast member. It was produced by Verity Films and the Army Kinematograph Service for the Royal Army Ordnance Corps.

Synopsis
The educational film aims to training service personnel the value of the mess and the cooking of food in the Army.

References

External links
 

1942 films
British black-and-white films
British World War II propaganda films
Sponsored films
1940s English-language films